R.O.O.T.S. (short for Route of Overcoming the Struggle) is the second studio album by American rapper Flo Rida. It was released on March 24, 2009, by Poe Boy Entertainment and Atlantic Records.<ref name=countdown>iTunes Countdown to R.O.O.T.S. iTunes.'.' Retrieved February 16, 2009.</ref>

Background
In an interview with Billboard Magazine, Flo Rida stated the inspiration for the album comes from his success and knowing that it wasn’t an overnight thing. "It also takes inspiration to turn an album, so I had to really get everything together." Flo Rida has also stated that the album cover was done this way because he admittedly has an 'addiction to being shirtless' and he wanted to show his body, and show his addiction to the world.

Singles
"Right Round" was released as the album's lead single, and became Flo Rida's second number-one hit. Released on January 25, 2009, the song debuted at number 58 on the US Billboard Hot 100 on February 18, 2009. The song sold a record breaking 636,000 digital copies in its first week, breaking his own record that he had set with his hit single "Low".Paul Grein, Week Ending Feb. 15, 2009: Taylor Swift Gets Last Laugh - Chart Watch, Yahoo.com Though uncredited the song with singer Kesha as a guest vocalist. The song jumped to number 1 on the Billboard Hot 100, and Billboard Pop 100. In its second week, the song sold another 460,000 downloads, the third highest one-week record, topping the one million mark in paid downloads in just two weeks, and becoming the fastest million-selling download ever in the United States. It ended up staying at number 1 for six consecutive weeks.

"Shone" was released digitally as the album's second single on February 24, 2009, and it has peaked at number 57 on the US Billboard Hot 100.

"Sugar" was released as the album's third single on March 17, 2009. It debuted on the US Billboard Hot 100 chart at number 25, making it Flo Rida's highest debut to date, and peaked at number 5 in the United States, also it has peaked at number 18 in the United Kingdom. The song features R&B singer Wynter Gordon as a guest vocalist.

"Jump" is the album's fourth single and was released on July 27, 2009 in the United Kingdom, and July 28, 2009 worldwide. The song features Canadian singer Nelly Furtado as a guest vocal. As of August 13, 2009 it has peaked at number 54 in the United States, number 27 in Canada, number 21 in the United Kingdom and number 18 in Australia.

"Be on You" was released as the album's fifth single on October 6, 2009. The song features American singer Ne-Yo as a guest vocalist. When the album was released the single debuted at number 90 in the United States. The song has received airplay since the album's release, and has since peaked at number 19 in the United States, and number 51 in the United Kingdom.

"Available" featuring fellow singer Akon, was released as the album's sixth single in the United Kingdom on November 23, 2009.

Reception

Initial critical response to R.O.O.T.S. was generally positive. At Metacritic, which assigns a normalized rating out of 100 to reviews from mainstream critics, the album has received a score of 62, indicating generally favorable reviews. The album was nominated for best rap album at the 52nd Grammy Awards, but lost to Relapse by Eminem.

SalesR.O.O.T.S.'' debuted at number 8 on the US Billboard 200 chart, selling 55,000 copies in its first week. As of August, 2009, the album has sold 223,000 copies in the United States. Closing the year, the album sold 300,000 copies becoming the eighth best selling rap album of 2009.

Track listing

Charts

Weekly charts

Year-end charts

Certifications

Notes

References

External links
 Flo Rida interview by Pete Lewis, 'Blues & Soul' April 2009

2009 albums
Albums produced by Benny Blanco
Albums produced by Dr. Luke
Albums produced by Dre & Vidal
Albums produced by Eric Hudson
Albums produced by Happy Perez
Albums produced by Jim Jonsin
Albums produced by Sounwave
Albums produced by Stargate
Albums produced by will.i.am
Atlantic Records albums
Flo Rida albums
Albums produced by the Inkredibles